Finest or The Finest may refer to:

 Finest (Midge Ure and Ultravox album), 2004
 Finest (The Proclaimers album), 2003
 Finest, an album by Liza Minnelli, 2009
 The Finest (Dead Poetic album), 2007
 The Finest (Fine Young Cannibals album), 1996
 "The Finest" (song), by The S.O.S. Band, 1986

See also
 Finest hour (disambiguation)
 Finest Moments (disambiguation)